is a 2012 Japanese anime television series produced by Xebec and Production I.G. Set in Kamogawa, the series revolves around Madoka Kyouno, Fin E Ld Si Laffinty (Lan) and Muginami, who all come from different worlds and attend the Kamogawa Girls' High School. While they form the Jersey Club to fulfill tasks for other school clubs, they are also destined to pilot strange robotic aircraft known as Vox Units, supported by a military organization named Novumundus stationed at an offshore base called Pharos. Their ultimate mission is to cease the intergalactic war between neighboring planets called Le Garite and De Metrio, in an attempt to restore the friendship between the planets' respective leaders named Dizelmine and Villagulio.

The first season of the anime by Production I.G and Xebec aired in Japan from January 8, 2012, to March 24, 2012. The first episode was pre-aired on January 1, 2012. A second season aired in Japan between July 1, 2012, and September 23, 2012. The anime has been licensed for streaming in North America by Viz Media and in the UK by Anime on Demand. The respective opening and ending themes are "Try Unite!" and "Hello!", both performed by Megumi Nakajima. An original video animation, titled , was released alongside a PlayStation 3 game on Blu-ray Hybrid Disc on August 23, 2012, having previously received an advance screening in ten theaters on June 23, 2012.

Episode list

Season 1

Season 2

Specials
The following are three-minute short episodes included on the BD/DVD releases.

References

Lagrange: The Flower of Rin-ne